John H. Schlee (June 2, 1939 – June 2, 2000) was an American professional golfer who played on the PGA Tour in the 1960s and 1970s.

Schlee was born in Kremmling, Colorado and grew up in Seaside, Oregon, where he was known as Jack Schlee. He served two years in the U.S. Army starting in 1957. Schlee attended Memphis State University and was a member of the golf team. Schlee took club pro jobs after college, and in 1965 was medalist at the inaugural PGA Tour Qualifying Tournament (qualifying school). He was the 1966 PGA Tour Rookie-of-the-Year making the cut in 13 events and finishing 48th on the money list.

Schlee played full-time on the PGA Tour from 1966–1977. He had more than 30 top-10 finishes in PGA Tour events. His career year was 1973 when he won the Hawaiian Open and finished one stroke behind Johnny Miller in the U.S. Open. Schlee had four top-10 finishes in major championships: the aforementioned solo 2nd at the 1973 U.S. Open, a T10 at the 1975 PGA Championship, a T4 at the 1976 PGA Championship, and a T8 at 1977 Masters Tournament.

Schlee was forced into part-time play on the PGA Tour in the mid-1970s due to a series of health problems starting with back surgery in 1975 and followed by knee surgery in 1976. Schlee took a club pro job in Rancho Viejo, Texas in June 1977 after his third serious ailment in as many years, a painful injury to his left thumb. His last appearance was at the Danny Thomas Memphis Classic in 1978.

In 1980, Schlee began a teaching pro career at Industry Hills Golf Resort, east of Los Angeles, California. He also invented devices to help students of the game learn. In 1986, Schlee wrote a book, Maximum Golf, which was a collection of his instructional theories and a tribute to his mentor, Ben Hogan.

After reaching the age of 50 in 1989, Schlee played in a few dozen Senior PGA Tour events but never came close to winning an event. His best finish in this venue was a T-42. Schlee lived in Texas during most of his regular career years and in California during his senior career years.

Schlee died in a Costa Mesa, California hospital in 2000 of complications from Alzheimer's disease.

Professional wins (1)

PGA Tour wins (1)

PGA Tour playoff record (0–1)

Results in major championships

CUT = missed the half-way cut
WD = withdrew
"T" indicates a tie for a place

Summary

Most consecutive cuts made – 7 (1969 U.S. Open – 1973 U.S. Open)
Longest streak of top-10s – 2 (1976 PGA – 1977 Masters)

See also
1965 PGA Tour Qualifying School graduates

References

External links

American male golfers
PGA Tour golfers
PGA Tour Champions golfers
Golfers from Colorado
Golfers from Oregon
Golfers from California
People from Grand County, Colorado
People from Seaside, Oregon
Deaths from dementia in California
Deaths from Alzheimer's disease
1939 births
2000 deaths